Lara Khaled Bahlawan (born 5 September 1994) is a Lebanese footballer who plays as a full-back or midfielder for Lebanese club SAS.

Career statistics

International
Scores and results list Lebanon's goal tally first, score column indicates score after each Bahlawan goal.

Honours 
SAS
 Lebanese Women's Football League: 2014–15, 2015–16, 2016–17, 2018–19, 2019–20, 2021–22
 Lebanese Women's FA Cup: 2013–14, 2014–15, 2018–19; runner-up: 2016–17, 2017–18
 Lebanese Women's Super Cup: 2016; runner-up: 2017, 2018
 WAFF Women's Clubs Championship runner-up: 2019

Lebanon
 WAFF Women's Championship third place: 2019

See also
 List of Lebanon women's international footballers

References

External links

 
 

1994 births
Living people
Footballers from Beirut
Lebanese women's footballers
Lebanon women's international footballers
Women's association football fullbacks
Women's association football midfielders
Lebanese Women's Football League players
Stars Association for Sports players